State Trunk Highway 139 (often called Highway 139, STH-139 or WIS 139) is a state highway in the US state of Wisconsin. It runs north–south in north central Wisconsin from a junction with US Highway 8 (US 8) near Cavour in central Forest County to the Michigan state line and its connection with M-189 at the Brule River to approximately four miles north of Tipler in Florence County. Along its route, WIS 139 serves as the main access route to Long Lake and serves parts of the Nicolet side of the Chequamegon-Nicolet National Forest.

Route description

Starting at US 8 near Cavour, WIS 139 traverses northward through multiple forests. It passes through Newald, Popple River, and Long Lake before reaching WIS 70. At this point, both WIS 139 and WIS 70 run concurrently with each other for under . After leaving the concurrency, WIS 139 travels northward for more than  before crossing the Michigan state line above the Brule River. At this point, the route transitions into M-189.

Major intersections

See also

References

External links

139
Transportation in Forest County, Wisconsin
Transportation in Florence County, Wisconsin